Thomas Bessis is a French bridge player.

Bridge accomplishments

Wins

 World Transnational Open Teams Championship (1) 2007 
 Buffett Cup (1) 2008
 North American Bridge Championships (3)
 Vanderbilt (2) 2010, 2012 
Norman Kay Platinum Pairs (1) 2015
 Cavendish Pairs 2019

Runners-up

 Bermuda Bowl (1) 2017
 Buffett Cup (1) 2012
 North American Bridge Championships (8)
 Blue Ribbon Pairs (2) 2011, 2015 
 Fast Open Pairs (1) 2012 
 Norman Kay Platinum Pairs (3) 2012, 2014, 2017 
 Spingold (1) 2013 
Jacoby Open Swiss Teams (1) 2019

References

External links
 
 

French contract bridge players